Pyramidella linearum is a species of sea snail, a marine gastropod mollusk in the family Pyramidellidae, the pyrams and their allies.

Description
The length of the shell varies between 10 mm and 16 mm.

Distribution
This species occurs in the Pacific Ocean between Mexico and Panama

References

External links
 To World Register of Marine Species
 

Pyramidellidae
Gastropods described in 1932